Kerstin Eckert (born August 25, 1966) is a scientist. She is the head of the new Chair of Transport Processes at Interfaces, a combined chair of Helmholtz-Zentrum Dresden-Rossendorf and TU Dresden created in October 2016.

Publications
List of publications at Google Scholar
List of publications at ORCID

References

https://tu-dresden.de/ing/maschinenwesen/ifvu/tpg/die-professur/inhaber-in
https://www.hzdr.de/db/Cms?pNid=425

1966 births
Living people
Otto von Guericke University Magdeburg alumni